The men's 50 kilometres event was part of the track cycling programme at the 1924 Summer Olympics.

The field consisted of 37 cyclists from 16 countries. The Vélodrome de Vincennes track was a  loop. Each cyclist had to complete 100 laps. Cyril Alden finished second for the second straight Olympics.

The Dutch team was represented by two cyclists, Ko Willems and Jan Maas (who was a late replacement for Jonkheer Bosch van Drakenstein). Their tactic was that Maas would attack, so that the other cyclists would be tired, after which Willems, the better sprinter, could win the race.

As planned, Maas attacked from the tenth kilometer. The other cyclists spent energy, getting him back, while Willems could cycle along and save his energy. Five loops before the finish, every looped cyclist had to exit the race, and only 15 cyclists remained, including Maas and Willems. In the last loop, the sprint started, with Wyld, Alden and De Martino. Willems went around them, and 100 m from the finish, all four men were next to each other. Willems was faster than the others, so he won the race.

Results
Source:

Placings are known for only the top seven finishers. Only Willems's time is known.

References

Men's 50 kilometres
Olympic track cycling events